Joyce Ann Elliott (born March 20, 1951) is an American politician from the state of Arkansas. Since 2009, she has been a member of the Arkansas Senate representing the 31st district, which consists of portions of Little Rock and Pulaski County. She was previously a member of the Arkansas House of Representatives, serving from 2001 to 2007. She is a member of the Democratic Party.

Elliott was the Democratic nominee in the 2020 election for Arkansas's 2nd congressional district, losing in the general election to incumbent Representative French Hill on November 3, 2020. If elected, she would have been the only Black representative from Arkansas ever elected to Congress.

Early life, education, and career 
Joyce Ann Elliott was born on March 20, 1951, in Willisville, Arkansas. Elliott was the second person of color to graduate from her recently integrated high school; the first was her older sister.

Elliott attended Southern Arkansas University where she earned a B.A. in English and speech. She attended Ouachita Baptist University where she earned an M.A. in English.

Elliott taught at Joe T. Robinson High School from 1989 to 2003.

State legislature

Elliott served in the Arkansas House of Representatives from 2000 to 2006. In 2008, she was elected to the Arkansas State Senate, where she represents the 31st district.

Elliott began working on hate crime legislation in 2001 during her first term in office. Arkansas is one of three states without a statute criminalizing various types of bias-motivated violence or intimidation.

As of 2020, she is the chair of the Arkansas Legislative Black Caucus.

In 2020 she was endorsed by Barack Obama.

Elections

2000 election

2010 election

Elliott ran against Republican nominee Timothy Griffin for the seat of retiring Democratic incumbent Vic Snyder who retired. In the general election, Elliott lost to Griffin.

2020 election

Elliott announced her candidacy for the U.S. House in Arkansas's 2nd congressional district on November 12, 2019, against Republican incumbent French Hill.

References

External links

Senator Joyce Elliott (D) official Arkansas Senate website
Joyce Elliott for Congress official campaign site

|-

|-

|-

1951 births
21st-century American politicians
21st-century American women politicians
African-American state legislators in Arkansas
African-American women in politics
Democratic Party Arkansas state senators
Living people
Ouachita Baptist University alumni
People from Nevada County, Arkansas
Southern Arkansas University alumni
Candidates in the 2020 United States elections
Women state legislators in Arkansas
21st-century African-American women
21st-century African-American politicians
20th-century African-American people
20th-century African-American women